Martin James McSorley (born May 18, 1963) is a Canadian former professional hockey player, who played in the National Hockey League (NHL) from 1983 until 2000. A versatile player, he was able to play both the forward and defense positions.

A former head coach of the Springfield Falcons of the American Hockey League (2002–04), aside from his hockey career, McSorley has  worked as an actor, appearing in several film and television roles. McSorley was a valued teammate of Wayne Gretzky during their years playing together for the Edmonton Oilers and Los Angeles Kings, where he served as an enforcer. 

In 2000, his on-ice assault of Donald Brashear with his stick, in which Brashear suffered a severe concussion, led to McSorley's suspension and eventual retirement from ice hockey.

Biography

Early life and hockey career
McSorley was born in Hamilton, Ontario, but grew up near Cayuga, Haldimand County, Ontario. He made his NHL debut in October 1983 with the Pittsburgh Penguins, but rose to fame after a trade in September 1985 brought him to the Edmonton Oilers. His arrival and physical presence soon made Edmonton's incumbent enforcer Dave Semenko expendable, and McSorley inherited the title of "Wayne Gretzky's bodyguard".

This title would follow him to Los Angeles in 1988, when both he and Gretzky, along with Mike Krushelnyski, were obtained by the Los Angeles Kings. With the Kings, McSorley's bruising style made him a fan favorite; but he strove to improve his game beyond being primarily known as an enforcer, earning great respect around the league for his hard work ethic, his fine team play, and his articulate intelligence off the ice.

In the 1992–93 NHL regular season, McSorley led all defensemen in shorthanded goals with three.

The Kings reached the 1993 Stanley Cup Finals against the Montreal Canadiens, but in Game 2 with the Kings up 2–1, McSorley was caught with an illegal stick, contributing to the Canadiens game-tying goal. Montreal ending up winning that game in overtime and ultimately took the series in five games. McSorley otherwise had ten points in the playoffs, and was the only King to score during the final game. Some suggested that he was the second most dominant King after Gretzky in the playoffs.

McSorley was then traded the following off-season in an August 1993 trade sent him to the Pittsburgh Penguins in exchange for offensive forward Shawn McEachern; however, his stay in Pittsburgh would be brief (only 47 games). The Kings re-acquired him on February 16, 1994. Back with the Kings, he assisted on Gretzky's goal which broke Gordie Howe's all-time goal-scoring record. On March 14, 1996, McSorley left the Kings' organization for good, traded to the New York Rangers as part of a multi-player deal.

After completing the 1995–96 season with the Rangers, McSorley returned to the West Coast after being acquired by the San Jose Sharks in August 1996. He spent two injury-plagued seasons with the Sharks before returning to Edmonton as a free agent in October 1998. Confined to a part-time role in his second stint in Edmonton, he left after one season and signed with the Boston Bruins in December 1999.  As a Bruin, his NHL career would come to a sudden and infamous end in a game against the Vancouver Canucks on February 21, 2000.

Assault conviction
In a game between the Bruins and the Vancouver Canucks in Vancouver on February 21, 2000, McSorley swung his stick and hit Donald Brashear in the head with 4.6 seconds left in the game. Brashear fell backwards and hit his head hard on the ice, losing consciousness and suffering a Grade III concussion. McSorley was charged with assault and suspended by the NHL for the remainder of the 1999–2000 season (including the playoffs), missing 23 games. On October 6, 2000, Judge William Kitchen of the Provincial Court of British Columbia found him guilty of assault with a weapon for his attack on Brashear. He was sentenced to 18 months probation. The trial was the first for an on-ice attack by an NHL player since Dino Ciccarelli's 1988 trial.

After his assault conviction, his NHL suspension was extended to one full year through February 21, 2001. It was the longest suspension for an on-ice incident in modern NHL history. McSorley's contract expired during the suspension, and he would never play in another NHL game. 

He appeared in 14 games for the Grand Rapids Griffins of the IHL in 2000-01, and retired at the end of the season.

United Kingdom
During his suspension, he attempted to continue playing hockey in the United Kingdom with the London Knights, where his elder brother Chris was coaching, but this move was blocked by the International Ice Hockey Federation, in deference to the NHL suspension. A similar intention to play in Germany for the Munich Barons also failed, but he then played for the Grand Rapids Griffins in their final IHL season, dressing for 14 games.

In the autumn of 2001, following the completion of his suspension, McSorley again looked towards the other side of the Atlantic. He considered purchasing the then struggling Cardiff Devils team with his brother, in order to pursue a new player-coach role and to develop interest in the sport in the UK.

McSorley appeared as a guest player for both Great Britain and the Cardiff Devils during a series of games in November 2001, but the business deal failed to materialise.

Coaching career
McSorley coached the American Hockey League team the Springfield Falcons between 2002 and 2004.

Film and TV career
From 1995 to 1997, McSorley also appeared in four movies in small roles: Bad Boys (1995), Forget Paris (1995), Con Air (1997) and Do Me A Favor (1997).

During the 2005–06 NHL season, McSorley worked for Fox Sports West in Los Angeles, providing in-studio analysis of games involving the Los Angeles Kings or the Mighty Ducks of Anaheim. He provided color commentary for the San Jose Sharks games on FSN Bay Area during 2006–07 NHL season. McSorley's time in that role ended mysteriously midway through the Sharks playoff series with Detroit, when the Sharks announced McSorley would not return for a Game 3 broadcast for personal reasons. No further explanation was given.

He appeared in one episode of CSI: Miami in 2005 as rink manager Andrew Greven. On July 30, 2007, McSorley guest starred on ABC Family's Greek as himself playing a hockey goaltender. In February 2008, McSorley was featured as one of the pros on Pros vs Joes on Spike TV.

Canadian singer-songwriter Kathleen Edwards referred to McSorley in her song "I Make the Dough, You Get the Glory", with the lyric, "You're the Great One, I'm Marty McSorley..., I make the dough, but you get the glory." McSorley appears in the song's music video.

McSorley is currently a TV analyst for Sportsnet and occasionally Hockey Night in Canada. He is a regular at Staples Center during Kings hockey games.

Personal life
McSorley currently resides in Hermosa Beach, California. He married beach volleyball player Leanne Schuster in August 2002. They have three children.

Awards and achievements
1986–87 – NHL – Stanley Cup (Edmonton)
1987–88 – NHL – Stanley Cup (Edmonton)
1990–91 – NHL Plus-Minus Award

Career statistics
Bold indicates led league

Transactions
July 30, 1982 – Signed as a free agent with the Pittsburgh Penguins.
September 11, 1985 – Traded by the Pittsburgh Penguins, along with Tim Hrynewich and Craig Muni to the Edmonton Oilers in exchange for Gilles Meloche.
August 9, 1988 – Traded by the Edmonton Oilers, along with Wayne Gretzky and Mike Krushelnyski, to the Los Angeles Kings in exchange for Jimmy Carson, Martin Gelinas, Los Angeles' 1989 1st round draft choice, Los Angeles' 1991 1st round draft choice, Los Angeles' 1993 1st round draft choice and $15 million.
August 27, 1993 – Traded by the Los Angeles Kings to the Pittsburgh Penguins in exchange for Shawn McEachern.
February 16, 1994 – Traded by the Pittsburgh Penguins, along with Jim Paek, to the Los Angeles Kings in exchange for Shawn McEachern and Tomas Sandstrom.
March 14, 1996 – Traded by the Los Angeles Kings, along with Jari Kurri and Shane Churla, to the New York Rangers in exchange for Ray Ferraro, Ian Laperrière, Mattias Norström, Nathan LaFayette and New York's 1997 4th round choice.
August 20, 1996 – Traded by the New York Rangers to the San Jose Sharks in exchange for Jayson More, Brian Swanson and San Jose's 1997 4th round choice.
October 1, 1998 – Signed as a free agent with the Edmonton Oilers.
December 9, 1999 – Signed as a free agent with the Boston Bruins.

See also
List of NHL players with 2000 career penalty minutes

References

External links

Video of the Brashear event

1963 births
Belleville Bulls players
Boston Bruins players
Canadian ice hockey defencemen
Edmonton Oilers players
Living people
Los Angeles Kings players
National Hockey League broadcasters
New York Rangers players
Canadian people convicted of assault
Pittsburgh Penguins players
San Jose Sharks announcers
San Jose Sharks players
Sportspeople convicted of crimes
Sportspeople from Haldimand County
Sportspeople from Hamilton, Ontario
Springfield Falcons coaches
Stanley Cup champions
Undrafted National Hockey League players
Violence in sports
Canadian ice hockey coaches